This is a list of all managers of Al Sadd SC. Since 1969 the first coach was Hamad Al Attiyah, and the first coach to achieve a title with him was the Sudanese Hassan Othman, and more than his coach was the Portuguese Jesualdo Ferreira for four seasons. Current coach Javi Gracia took over for Xavi on 8 December 2021.

Background
The first to coach Al Sadd SC is Hamad Al Attiyah. It did not last long. In the mid-seventies with coaches from Sudan, including Hassan Othman for three years, to begin the stage of contracting with Brazilian coaches from the eighties until the end of the nineties, their number reached 14, most notably Zé Mário, Evaristo de Macedo and Procópio Cardoso, With the beginning of the millennium Al Sadd SC contracted with several coaches and there was no stability and from several nationalities. They are Džemaludin Mušović for the second time after the first season 1994–95, Luka Peruzović, Jorge Fossati, Ilie Balaci, Bora Milutinović, Émerson Leão, Cosmin Olăroiu, René Meulensteen, Co Adriaanse, and for the third time the Bosnian Mušović. On January 14, 2011 Al Sadd SC contracted with Jorge Fossati for the second time after the first in the 2006–07 season which was not successful, but in the second Fossati managed to lead him to win the 2011 AFC Champions League for the second time in its history after the first in 1988–89 to ensure a historic participation in the FIFA Club World Cup where they played against the giant FC Barcelona to occupy third place and guarantee a bronze medal, and at the end of the season after failing to win the 2011–12 Qatar Stars League and not guaranteeing participation in the AFC Champions League, Fossati officially left his post.

He was succeeded by Moroccan Hussein Ammouta where he spent more than three years during which Ammouta achieved four titles, His first test came in the 2012 Sheikh Jassem Cup. Al Sadd, playing most of their matches with their second team, achieved the runners-up position when they lost to Al Rayyan SC in the final. In the league, his team's form won the appraisal of many pundits, with them winning all of their first nine games, setting a new league record. Sadd were eventually held to a goalless draw by Al Kharaitiyat on 8 December 2012. Al-Sadd won the league on 13 April 2013, one match before the end of the league. It was the first Al-Sadd's championship since 2007. On 28 November 2015, Ferreira was named the head coach of Al Sadd SC, on a six-month deal with the option of a further year. Having won the 2018–19 Qatar Stars League with a game to play, he left the team in May and was replaced by Xavi. On 28 May 2019 it was announced that Xavi would take over as manager of Al Sadd on a two-year contract. Xavi helped the club reach the semi-finals of the AFC Champions League, where they were eliminated by Al-Hilal FC 6–5 on aggregate. In the league, the club finished third. In the 2019–20 season, Xavi led his team to win three domestic trophies, including the league and the Qatar Cup. In the 2020 AFC Champions League, Al Sadd reached the round of 16 but were eliminated 1–0 by Persepolis. During his 97 games in charge of Al Sadd, spanning two and a half years, he led the club to seven trophies. On 3 November 2021, Al Sadd drew 3–3 against Al-Duhail in his final game in-charge. Two days later Al Sadd announced Xavi's move to Barcelona after his release clause was paid.

Managerial history

Notes
 Note 1 denotes player–manager role.
 Note 2 denotes caretaker role.

List of managers
Information correct as of 5 November 2021. Only competitive matches are counted.

Trophies

Bold = current manager

References

Al Sadd SC
Al Sadd SC